Bundi District is a district in the state of Rajasthan in western India. The town of Bundi is the district headquarters. It has an area of 5,550 km2 and a population of 1,110,906 (2011 census). It is divided into 5 tehsils which are: Bundi, Hindoli, Nainwa, Keshoraipatan and Indergarh.

History
Stone Age tools dating around 5,000 to 200,000 years before present, were found in Bundi and Bhilwara districts of the state.
South-east Region of Rajasthan is known as Hadoti - the land of the Hada Rajputs. Hadas are a major branch of the Chauhan Agnikula Rajputs (hailing from fire dynasty). They had settled in the hilly terrain of Mewar, at Bambaoda, near Bijoliya in the 12th century CE. Bundi was established in 1241 CE by Rao Deva Singh. This was the first step in the establishment of Hadauti, when the Hadas moved down from the ‘Pathar’ around Bambaoda. Bundi takes its name from the Bando Naal or the narrow passage, between the rugged hills. The town of Bundi is nestled in the cleft of the Aravalli Range and has a special medieval flavor quite untouched by time. Prince Jait Singh of Bundi captured Kota in 1264 AD and Kota became a part of Bundi as the Jaghir (land grant) of the eldest prince of Bundi. Kota became a separate state in 1624. The state of Jhalawar was formed in 1838 out of Kota territory.

Demographics

According to the 2011 census Bundi district has a population of 1,110,906, roughly equal to the nation of Cyprus or the US state of Rhode Island. This gives it a ranking of 415th in India (out of a total of 640). Its population growth rate over the decade 2001-2011 was 15.7%. Bundi has a sex ratio of 922 females for every 1000 males, and a literacy rate of 62.31%. 20.05% of the population lives in urban areas. Scheduled Castes and Scheduled Tribes make up 18.97% and 20.57% of the population respectively.

Languages

At the time of the 2011 census, 76.02% of the population spoke Hadauti, 14.35% Hindi, 4.67% Rajasthani and 1.01% Punjabi as their first language.

See also
Hadoti

References

External links
 

 
Districts of Rajasthan
Districts in Kota division